Kal may refer to:

People
 Kal (name)
 Kal or KAL, Kevin Kallaugher (born 1955), editorial cartoonist

Places
 Käl, a town in Luxembourg
 Kal, Fars, a village in Iran
 Kal, Susan, a village in Khuzestan Province, Iran
 Kal, Kurdistan, a village in Iran
 Kal Rural District, in Fars Province, Iran
 Kal, Poland, a village
 Kal, Hrastnik, Slovenia, a settlement
 Kal, Ivančna Gorica, Slovenia, a village
 Kal, Pivka, Slovenia, a village
 Kal, Semič, Slovenia, a village
 Kal, Tolmin, Slovenia, a village
 Kal, Zagorje ob Savi, Slovenia, a village

Entertainment
 Kal (band), a Romani band from Serbia
 Kal Online, a MMORPG video game by Inixsoft
 Kal (Doctor Who), the first Doctor Who villain
 Kal: Yesterday and Tomorrow, a 2005 Hindi film
 Kal (telefilm) PTV Home

Business
 Kal Tire, a Canadian company
 Kerala Automobiles Limited, an Indian automobile manufacturer
 Korala Associates Limited, a software company

Language
 Kurdish Academy of Language
 ISO 639-2 and 639-3 codes for the Greenlandic language

Transport
 Kalamazoo Transportation Center, station code
 Kallang MRT station, MRT station abbreviation
 Kaltag Airport, IATA airport code
 Korean Air, ICAO code

Other uses
 Kadıköy Anadolu Lisesi, a high school in Istanbul, Turkey

See also
 Kall (disambiguation)
 KALS (disambiguation)
 All Wikipedia pages beginning with Kal
 All Wikipedia pages beginning with Kal-e